Georgy Ivanovich Gushchenko (Russian: Георгий Иванович Гущенко; born 2 March 1931) is a Russian rower who represented the Soviet Union. He competed at the 1952 Summer Olympics in Helsinki with the men's coxed four where they were eliminated in the semi-final repêchage. He competed at the 1956 Summer Olympics in Melbourne with the men's eight where they were eliminated in the semi-final.

References

1931 births
Living people
Soviet male rowers
Olympic rowers of the Soviet Union
Rowers at the 1952 Summer Olympics
Rowers at the 1956 Summer Olympics
European Rowing Championships medalists